Philip Robert James (born October 21, 1949), better known as Skip James, is a former American professional baseball player. He played in the Major League Baseball(MLB) before a brief stint with the San Francisco Giants, and then played in the Nippon Professional Baseball (NPB) for the Yokohama Taiyo Whales.

Career
James attended Shawnee Mission North High School, and then played football and baseball at the University of Kansas, graduating in 1971. He played in the Pacific Coast League for eight years and was finally drafted in 1977 by the San Francisco Giants; he made his debut on September 12, 1977. He played for the Giants for four months as a pinch-hitter (hitting a game-winning two-run single in September against the Los Angeles Dodgers) before they sent him back to the minors. He played for the Vancouver Canadians in 1979, and in 1980 left the United States to play in Japan for the Yokohama Taiyo Whales, besides Félix Millán.

In 1982, he was hired as a graduate assistant coach at Kansas, and worked there as an assistant coach in 1983 and 1984 as well.

References

External links

1949 births
Living people
American expatriate baseball players in Canada
American expatriate baseball players in Japan
Baseball coaches from Illinois
Baseball players from Illinois
Decatur Commodores players
Fresno Giants players
Kansas Jayhawks baseball players
Major League Baseball first basemen
Nippon Professional Baseball first basemen
Nippon Professional Baseball outfielders
Phoenix Giants players
Vancouver Canadians players
Yokohama Taiyō Whales players